The men's individual skating event was held as part of the figure skating at the 1928 Winter Olympics. It was the fourth appearance of the event, which had previously been held at the Summer Olympics in 1908 and 1920 and was also part of the first Winter Games in 1924. The competition was held from Tuesday, 14 February to Friday, 17 February 1928. Seventeen figure skaters from ten nations competed.

Results
Gillis Grafström successfully defended his 1920 and 1924 title again with Austrian Willy Böckl finishing in second place as four years earlier. Another Austrian Karl Schäfer finished fourth in this event. He went on to win gold medals in the next two consecutive Olympic Games.

Referee:
  Ulrich Salchow

Judges:
  Kurt Dannenberg
  Eduard Engelmann
  Paul Baudouin
  Herbert J. Clarke
  Sakari Ilmanen
  Joel B. Liberman
  Vojtěch Veselý

References

External links
 Official Olympic Report
 sports-reference
 

Figure skating at the 1928 Winter Olympics
1928 in figure skating
Men's events at the 1928 Winter Olympics